In the FIFA World Cup, the following male football players have made the most final tournament appearances.

Matches
The following players had caps in at least 15 World Cup final tournament matches, which requires a minimum of three World Cup appearances.

Tournaments
The following players have been included in their national squads for multiple World Cup final tournaments. Players with four or more squad inclusions are listed here.

See also
List of players who have appeared in multiple FIFA Women's World Cups

References

FIFA website
Player profiles
 
World Cup squad lists

Ranking of players by World Cup matches

2018 World Cup match lineups

Other sources

 

 
Players who have appeared in multiple FIFA World Cups
Lists of association football players
FIFA World Cup records and statistics
World Cup appearances